An Impudent Girl is a 1985 French film directed by Claude Miller. It stars Charlotte Gainsbourg, who won the César Award for Most Promising Actress, and Bernadette Lafont, who won the César Award for Best Actress in a Supporting Role. It is a free adaptation of the novel Frankie Addams (French title of Carson McCullers's  The Member of the Wedding).

The film won the Louis Delluc Prize, and received César nominations for Best Film, Best Director, Most Promising Actor, Best Writing, Best Costume Design and Best Sound.

Plot 
Charlotte Castang is a working-class 13-year-old girl, who lives in a drab, run-down neighbourhood, and is ready to become an adult. Her mother died giving birth to her, and she lives with her crass brother, and her father whose attention is elsewhere. Her only friend is Lulu, a sick 10-year-old she regards as a pest. Charlotte is antisocial, bored and dreams of a better life. Her life improves when she meets Clara Bauman, a pianist prodigy whom she admires. Charlotte wants to be friends with Clara, whom she sees as a potential route to prosperity, while the sophisticated Clara jokingly suggests that Charlotte should become her manager.

Cast 
Charlotte Gainsbourg as Charlotte Castang 
Clothilde Baudon as Clara Bauman 
Julie Glenn as Lulu 
Bernadette Lafont as Léone 
Jean-Claude Brialy as Sam 
Jean-Philippe Écoffey as Jean 
Raoul Billerey as Antoine Castang 
Richard Guerry as Regard sombre

Production
The film was seen as a return by Claude Miller to the material of his first feature, The Best Way to Walk. Miller:
I'm fascinated by those violent passions that make you ready to cut your throat for something you believe in, passions that, for better or worse, lose their edge as you grow older. In An Impudent Girl though the conflict is much less violent than the humiliation and hurt of The Best Way to Walk. The main character comes out of it very well, in fact it's certainly my most optimistic film. I wasn't trying to show a terrible drama, just one of those ordinary events which happen to all adolescents and shape us for life. I'm the proof because I still remember those tiny episodes that ended up affecting me more deeply than I ever realised at the time.
The film was a loose adaptation of the novel The Member of the Wedding by Carson McCullers, although that is uncredited. Miller:
It isn't a direct adaptation. There were just enough elements from the book for us to apply for the rights. First of all the Americans who owned them took ages to reply. Then they wanted a huge sum of money, almost as much as the cost of the film.
Two weeks before shooting was scheduled to begin, the rights had not been secured. Miller decided to go ahead and make the movie anyway. "Now we're negotiating to pay a reasonable percentage," he said in 1986. "Fortunately the film has been a hit."

Miller cast Gainsbourg after seeing her in the film Paroles et Musiques. He approached her parents for permission to cast her. It helped the marketability of the movie because, as Miller says, "Charlotte was in a way already a star because of her parents - people went to see her out of curiosity."

Reception
The Guardian said it was "one of Miller's best films since The Best Way to Walk".

The film was a success at the box office selling 2,761,141 tickets and was the 11th most attended film of the year at the French box office. Miller later made The Little Thief with Gainsbourg.

References

External links 
 
 
 
 Review of film at Time Out Magazine

1985 films
1980s coming-of-age comedy-drama films
1980s teen comedy-drama films
Films based on works by Carson McCullers
Films directed by Claude Miller
French coming-of-age comedy-drama films
1980s French-language films
French teen comedy-drama films
Louis Delluc Prize winners
Films about puberty
1980s French films